The Healers is an album by David Murray and Randy Weston released on the Italian Black Saint label in 1987. It features duo performances by Murray and Weston.

Reception
The Allmusic review by Scott Yanow awarded the album 4 stars, stating: "This set of duets by David Murray (doubling on tenor and bass clarinet) and pianist Randy Weston is a bit of a surprise. Rather than performing standards or some of Weston's 'hits,' the duo stretches out on three obscurities by the two musicians (only Weston's 'Blue Moses' is slightly known) and Butch Morris' 'Clever Beggar.' Weston provides a solid harmonic and rhythmic foundation for Murray's thick-toned but sometimes screeching flights, and the combination works pretty well."

Track listing
 "Clever Beggar" (Butch Morris) - 8:15  
 "The Healers" (Randy Weston) - 14:19  
 "M'Bizo" (David Murray) - 6:12  
 "Blue Moses" (Randy Weston) - 14:49  
Recorded at Seltzer Sound, New York City, September 26, 1987.

Personnel
David Murray - tenor saxophone, bass clarinet
Randy Weston - piano

References

1987 albums
David Murray (saxophonist) albums
Black Saint/Soul Note albums
Randy Weston albums